Graham Birkett is a former Scotland international rugby union player.

Rugby Union career

Amateur career

He played for Harlequins.

He then played for London Scottish.

Provincial career

He played for Anglo-Scots.

He played for Middlesex in England.

International career

He received one cap for Scotland in 1975. This was on Scotland's tour of New Zealand in 1975 and Birkett played against the All Blacks.

References

1954 births
Living people
Scottish rugby union players
Scotland international rugby union players
Rugby union centres
London Scottish F.C. players
Harlequin F.C. players
Middlesex County RFU players
Scottish Exiles (rugby union) players